Argentino Rafael  Iglesias (May 25, 1924 – January 1, 1999) was an Argentine heavyweight boxer. He won a gold medal at the 1948 Summer Olympics in London, England by knocking out Gunnar Nilsson in the final. Iglesias was knocked out himself in his only bout as a professional, in 1952.

Olympic Boxing Results
Rafael Iglesias' results from the heavyweight division at the 1948 Olympic boxing tournament in London:

 Round of 16: defeated Jose Arturo Rubio of Spain by decision
 Quarterfinal: defeated Uber Baccilieri of Italy by decision
 Semifinal: defeated John Arthur of South Africa by decision
 Final: defeated Gunnar Nilsson of Sweden by a second-round knockout

References

External links

profile

1924 births
1999 deaths
Heavyweight boxers
Olympic boxers of Argentina
Boxers at the 1948 Summer Olympics
Olympic gold medalists for Argentina
Olympic medalists in boxing
Argentine male boxers
Medalists at the 1948 Summer Olympics
Sportspeople from Avellaneda